Campanulorchis globifera is a species of orchid endemic to Vietnam.

References

Orchids of Vietnam
globifera